Aleksander Papiewski (born 12 May 1939) is a retired Polish football manager.

References

1939 births
Living people
Polish football managers
Śląsk Wrocław managers
Radomiak Radom managers